Bernard Edward Anderson (29 January 1941 – 22 August 2012) was an Australian rules footballer who played for the Richmond Football Club in the Victorian Football League (VFL).

Family
He is the brother of Richmond footballer Noel Anderson.

Notes

References
 Hogan P: The Tigers Of Old, Richmond FC, (Melbourne), 1996.

External links 
		

1941 births
2012 deaths
Australian rules footballers from Victoria (Australia)
Richmond Football Club players